John O'Malley may refer to:
 John O'Malley (politician) (1878–1940), American politician and businessman in Milwaukee, Wisconsin 
 John F. O'Malley (1885–c.1950), American architect based in Rhode Island
 John J. O'Malley (1915–1970), American architect primarily for the Archdiocese of New York
 John W. O'Malley (born 1927), American Jesuit historian of religion

See also
 John O'Meally
 John Mallee